Mailson Francisco de Farías (born 23 December 1990) is a Brazilian footballer who plays as a winger for Jacuipense.

Club career
Mailson started his senior professional career with Camboriu and in the following years, he represented lower-tier clubs. He also had a stint with Portuguese club Alcanenense. On 1 August 2014, he signed for Série A (top tier) club Chapecoense.

After a stint with Juventude, Mailson signed for Paysandu of Série B on 23 June 2016. In 2017, he joined CRB on a loan deal. He scored his first goal in a 1–1 draw against Luverdense. In July, his contract was terminated.

In August 2017, Mailson signed for the South Korean club Jeju United. He made his debut on 13 August, in a 2–0 victory over Gangwon.

In January 2018, Mailson joined the Brazilian club Criciúma EC.

Honours
Chiangrai United
 Thailand Champions Cup (1): 2020

References

External links

1990 births
Living people
Association football midfielders
Brazilian footballers
Brazilian expatriate footballers
Camboriú Futebol Clube players
Itumbiara Esporte Clube players
A.C. Alcanenense players
Sociedade Esportiva e Recreativa Caxias do Sul players
Associação Chapecoense de Futebol players
Esporte Clube Juventude players
Jeju United FC players
Paysandu Sport Club players
Criciúma Esporte Clube players
Al-Arabi SC (Qatar) players
Clube de Regatas Brasil players
Vila Nova Futebol Clube players
Campeonato Brasileiro Série D players
Campeonato Brasileiro Série C players
Campeonato Brasileiro Série B players
Campeonato Brasileiro Série A players
K League 1 players
Qatar Stars League players
Expatriate footballers in Qatar
Expatriate footballers in South Korea
Brazilian expatriate sportspeople in Qatar
Brazilian expatriate sportspeople in South Korea